Āchārya means the Head of an order of ascetics. Some of the famous achāryas are Bhadrabahu, Kundakunda, Samantabhadra, Umaswami, Sthulibhadra.

In Digambara Jainism, Āchārya has thirty-six primary attributes (mūla guṇa) consisting in:
Twelve kinds of austerities (tapas);
Ten virtues (dasa-lakṣaṇa dharma);
Five kinds of observances in regard to faith, knowledge, conduct, austerities, and power.
Six essential duties (Ṣadāvaśyaka); and
Gupti- Controlling the threefold activity of:
the body;
the organ of speech; and
the mind.

According to the Jain text, Dravyasamgraha, 

Chandanaji became the first Jain woman to receive the title of Acharya in 1987.

Mūla Guṇa

Twelve kinds of austerities (tapas)
External austerities 
The external austerities (bāhya tapas) are fasting (anaśana), reduced diet (avamaudarya), special restrictions for begging food (vrttiparisamkhyāna), giving up stimulating and delicious dishes (rasaparityāga), lonely habitation (viviktaśayyāsana), and mortification of the body (kāyakleśa).

Internal austerities
Expiation (prāyaścitta), reverence (vinaya), service (vaiyāvrttya), study (svādhyāya), renunciation (vyutsarga), and meditation (dhyāna) are the internal austerities (antarañg tapas).

Acharya Pujyapada'''s Sarvārthasiddhi:

  Five kinds of observances 
Five kinds of observances in regard to faith, knowledge, conduct, austerities, and power. These are:Darśanācāra- Believing that the pure Self is the only object belonging to the self and all other objects, including the karmic matter (dravya karma and no-karma) are alien; further, believing in the six substances (dravyas), seven Realities (tattvas) and veneration of Jina, Teachers, and the Scripture, is the observance in regard to faith (darśanā).Jñānācāra- Reckoning that the pure Self has no delusion, is distinct from attachment and aversion, knowledge itself, and sticking to this notion always is the observance in regard to knowledge (jñānā).Cāritrācāra- Being free from attachment etc. is right conduct which gets obstructed by passions. In view of this, getting always engrossed in the pure Self, free from all corrupting dispositions, is the observance in regard to conduct (cāritrā).Tapācāra- Performance of different kinds of austerities is essential to spiritual advancement. Performance of penances with due control of senses and desires constitutes the observance in regard to austerities (tapā).Vīryācāra- Carrying out the above mentioned four observances with full vigour and intensity, without digression and concealment of true strength, constitutes the observance in regard to power (vīryā).

 Six essential duties 

Six essential duties (Şadāvaśyaka) of the Ācārya are:samatā (sāmāyika) – Equanimity; the state of being without inclination or aversion towards birth or death, gain or loss, glee or pain, friend or foe, etc.vandanā – Adoration, salutation; of particular Tīrthañkara, or Supreme Being (Parameşthī).stavan – Worshipping; making obeisance to the twenty-four Tīrthañkaras or the five Supreme Beings (Pañca Parameşthī).pratikramaṇa – Self-censure, repentance; to drive oneself away from the multitude of karmas, virtuous or wicked, done in the past.kāyotsarga – Non-attachment to the body; contemplating on the pure Self, thereby disregarding the body.svādhyāya'' – Contemplation of knowledge; study of the Scripture, teaching, questioning, reflection, reciting, and preaching.

See also 
 Digambara monk
 Tapas (Indian religions)

Notes

References